Gyan Riley (born 1977) is an American guitarist and composer. He is a son of minimalist composer Terry Riley. They frequently collaborate, including a tour in Europe in September 2016. Gyan Riley studied at San Francisco Conservatory of Music. He released his solo album Stream of Gratitude in 2013 on John Zorn's Tzadik Records. He has also performed with Zakir Hussain, Dawn Upshaw, Arooj Aftab, and the San Francisco Symphony, among others. In 2015, he released Nayive Eviyan, a collaboration with Czech violinist Iva Bittová.

Discography

As leader 
 Food for the Bearded (New Albion, 2002)
 Melismantra (Self-released, 2007)
 New York Sessions (Agyanamus Music, 2010)
 Stream of Gratitude (Tzadik, 2011)
 Terry Riley & Gyan Riley Live with Terry Riley (Sri Moonshine Music, 2011)
Sprig (National Sawdust Tracks, 2018)

As sideman 
With John Zorn
 John Zorn’s Olympiad Volume 1: Dither Plays Zorn (Tzadik, 2015) with Dither
 Midsummer Moons (Tzadik, 2017) with Julian Lage
 The Book Beri'ah: Chesed (Tzadik, 2018) with Julian Lage
 Nove Cantici Per Francesco D'Assisi (Tzadik, 2019) with Julian Lage and Bill Frisell
 Virtue (Tzadik, 2020) with Julian Lage and Bill Frisell
 Teresa De Ávila (Tzadik, 2021) with Julian Lage and Bill Frisell
 Parables (Tzadik, 2021) with Julian Lage and Bill Frisell
 A Garden of Forking Paths (Tzadik, 2022) with Julian Lage and Bill Frisell
 Bagatelles Vol. 10 (Tzadik, 2022) with Julian Lage

References

External links

AllMusic
Discogs

American male guitarists
American male composers
21st-century American composers
San Francisco Conservatory of Music alumni
1977 births
Living people
Guitarists from California
Tzadik Records artists
21st-century American guitarists
21st-century American male musicians